The Cork-Tipperary rivalry is a Gaelic football rivalry between Irish county teams Cork and Tipperary, who first played each other in 1888. It is a rivalry that has existed since the first provincial championship, however, it is less popular than its hurling counterpart. Cork's home ground is Páirc Uí Chaoimh and Tipperary's home ground is Semple Stadium.

While Cork have 37 Munster titles and Tipperary are ranked one below in third position on the roll of honour, they have also enjoyed success in the All-Ireland Senior Football Championship, having won 11 championship titles between them to date.

Statistics

All time results

Senior

References

External links
 Cork-Tipperary all time results

Tipperary
Tipperary county football team rivalries